Janne Katosalmi (born March 4, 1994) is a Finnish professional ice hockey right winger. He is currently contracted to KalPa of the Finnish Liiga and is playing in Mestis for IPK.

Katosalmi made his Liiga debut for KalPa during the 2013–14 season where he played five regular season games.

References

External links

1994 births
Living people
Finnish ice hockey right wingers
Iisalmen Peli-Karhut players
KalPa players
People from Lapinlahti
Sportspeople from North Savo